Arthur Heina (22 February 1915 – 27 February 1986) was a German swimmer. He competed in the men's 200 metre breaststroke at the 1936 Summer Olympics.

References

External links
 

1915 births
1986 deaths
German male swimmers
Olympic swimmers of Germany
Swimmers at the 1936 Summer Olympics
People from Gladbeck
Sportspeople from Münster (region)
German male breaststroke swimmers
20th-century German people